ȷ is a modified letter of the Latin alphabet, obtained by writing the lowercase letter j without a dot.

Dotless j was formerly used in Karelian to mark palatalisation.

Encoding

See also
 Dotless I
 J
 ɟ (dotless j with stroke, an IPA letter representing the voiced palatal stop)

References

Latin-script letters